The Society of Guardians or The Guardians, is an order within Western esotericism that integrates mystical Christian and Jewish Qabalistic (Kabbalistic) teachings. The Society combines an emphasis on meditation and contemplative practice, ceremonial ritual, and esoteric study with a nature-centered approach to spiritual development.

Operational groups exist on Great Barrier Island and in Auckland City, New Zealand. Independent groups no longer under the auspices of the society, but continuing its teachings and practices also exist in Australia (Bet Yerusha Sanctuary). Traditionally, each sanctuary is limited to 22 members who are described as "technical mystics". Although small in comparison to Orders such as the Golden Dawn, many members of the public benefited from the classes and correspondence courses conducted by the Guardians, before their Mt. Eden sanctuary closed after the death of the late Senior Guardian Michel Corbold (aka Michael Freedman) in 1996.

Early origins or influences

While the traditional history of the order claims descent from European mystics in the 12th-13th century there is no way to confirm the Society’s continued existence from before the late 1800s, however the historic narrative appears to refer to real groups and events from the obscure history of European free-thinkers, and tracks a thread of spiritual influence through the ages.

France: In the late 12th and early 13th centuries the Amalrician (followers of Amalric of Bena and David of Dinant) preached an independent, pantheistic, and mystical Christianity. They proclaimed that God is All (omnia sunt deus), and declared "all people will eventually reach salvation". Those not killed as heretics in 1209 later merged with the Beguines and Beghards, independent lay monastic communities who adopted the habit and Rule of the Franciscan Third Order. The sect spread through France, Italy, and Germany by travelling weavers (until 1474, entry to the Beghards was limited to members of the weavers' guild).

Sicily (Italy): The Spiritual Franciscans (Fraticelli) fled from Tuscany to Sicily after they were declared heretical by Pope Boniface VIII. They were also influenced by the Joachimites, who themselves drew heavily on ideas from the French Amalricians.

Joachimites: Joachim de Fiore was born in Calabria (Italy) around 1132 AD and served at the Sicilian Court. In the mid-1160s he went on pilgrimage to Jerusalem and Syria and became "converted to a deeper understanding of ancient (probably orthodox) Christianity". Joachim was a disciple of St. Bernard de Clairvaux, the Abbot and mystic who was Patron of the Knights Templar. The later Joachimites became associated with the Fraticelli branch of the Franciscans.

Abraham Abulafia: Spanish Kabbalist Abraham Abulafia (1240-1292) is a key proponent of the society's history/myth. He traveled to Israel, Syria, and Greece before settling in Sicily where he appropriated ideas from the Joachamites and Fraticelli Franciscans into his Kabbalistic tradition (Hames, 2012). It is said that "Franciscan Friars studied with Abulafia in Sicily" and later "rescued him from prison". Of these "Guardians" (Franciscan superiors are called Guardians not Abbots) Abulafia is reported to have said: "I saw that the belonged to the pious among the nations, and the words of religious fools need not be heeded, for the Law of the Lord has been handed to the Masters of Knowledge".

Florence (Italy) Mid 1400s–mid 1500s: The Platonic Academy in Florence was established under the patronage of Cosimo de' Medici and was closely linked with the Camaldolese Benedictine Order and the Monastery of St. Mary of the Angels. Flavius Mithridates (Guiglemo Raymond Moncado) a Jewish Kabbalist from Sicily who converted to Christianity joined the Academy working under its leaders Pico Della Mirandolla and Marsilio Ficino. He translated an entire Kabbalistic library from Sicily containing texts by Kabbalist Abraham Abulafia and his student Joseph Gikkatilla. The two principal founders of Christian Cabala were Pico Della Mirandolla and Franciscan Friar Francesco Giorgi Venteto.

Germany early 1500s onwards: The teachings of the Academy were taken from Florence to Germany in the early 1500s by Johannes Reuchlin (1455-1522) who was a student of Mirandolla. Johannes Trithemius (1462-1516) Abbot of the Benedictine Monastery of Spanheim was taught Kabbalah by Reuchlin and was also influenced by the occultist Frater Basilius Valentinius (Benedictine Prior of a monastery in Erfurt, Germany). Trithemius's students were Paracelsus and Heinrich Cornelius Agrippa (1486-1535). Agrippa lectured on the works of Reuchlin at the University of Dole in France then returned to Germany to study with Abbot Trithemius at Würzburg. In 1515 he lectured at the University of Pavia (Northern Italy) on the topic of Hermes Trismegistus, Kabbalah, and the works of Mirandolla and Ficino, and was taught esoteric teachings and by Paolo Ricci (Camillo Renato), a Franciscan friar born in Sicily who was condemned as a heretic.

Giordano Bruno (1548-1600), was a Dominican Friar, philosopher, mathematician, poet and astrologer. From 1593, Bruno was put on trial for heresy by the Inquisition due to pantheistic beliefs, denial of several core Catholic doctrines (including the virginity of Mary and transubstantiation). Bruno also wrote extensively on the Art of Memory (which is still part of the Guardians training lessons). He was deeply influenced by Arab astrology, Neoplatonism and Renaissance Hermeticism. In 1586 he left Germany to return to Italy in order to lecture at a University when the Inquisition found him guilty, and in 1600 he was burned at the stake in Rome.

According to the traditional history of the Guardians, the Order was active in Frankfurt-am-Main, Germany during the 1700s. It is uncertain if they were connected to (or the same group as) the Fratres Lucis who were also based there. Both integrated Jewish and Christian mystical traditions and claimed a connection back to the Florentine Academy. The Fratres Lucis admitted prominent Kabbalists such as Ephraim Hirschfeld and Franz Thomas von Schonfeld (Moses Dobrucshka) a Jew who later converted to Catholicism. The Order's predominant areas of study were the Kabbalah and mystical Christian theurgy. Kabbalistic scholar Franz Josef Molitor describes how the founder of the Frankfurt Fratres Lucis was initiated by "a Friar or monk who was the apothecary of his monastery and engaged in alchemical work, possessing occult knowledge he had received through Jews of a Kabbalistic mystical Sect".

Modern History: Michael Freedman (Late Senior Guardian)

Branches of the Guardians reportedly moved to France and England in the 1870s and Australia in the 1930s. Michel Tyne-Corbold joined the Melbourne Sanctuary of the Society in 1959, and became Senior Guardian in 1967 at which time he assumed the public pen name Michael Freedman. He has previously been an ordained Anglican priest but had left that vocation. In January 1968, Michel and three other Australians went to India to study at the Maharishi Academy in India. Corbold graduated from the Maharishi Mahesh Yogi's Academy (Rishikesh headquarters) in India and, upon returning to Australia, established himself as a Transcendental Meditation teacher.

During the 1960s Michael Freedman was a member of Mouni Sadhu's group in Melbourne. According to L.S, it is from this association with Mouni Sadhu that Michael created his adaption of a medieval mystical order. Mouni Sadhu (which means 'silent monk') was the pseudonym of Polish-German occultist Mieczyslaw Sudowski (Michael Sadau), who had been in a Rosicrucian group in Europe, and studied the Hermetic tradition of Gregory Ottonovich Mebes, a university professor and Russian Grand Master of the French Kabbalistic Order of the Rosy Cross and the Hermetic Brotherhood of Light (Fratres Lucis).

In 1935 Mouni Sadhu stayed at a society in Paris founded by renowned esotericist Paul Sedir (Yvon Le Loup), stayed at a Catholic monastery for a number of months on retreat, and was initiated into various French occult orders. After World War 2 he immigrated to Melbourne, Australia where he resided until his death in 1972. Throughout his life he had ongoing correspondence with Christian mystic Thomas Merton, and Theosophists C.W. Leadbeater and Annie Besant. He wrote numerous books including a translation of Paul Sedir's Initiations, a book on theurgy, and a book entitled Tarot: The Quintessence of Hermetic Occultism. He later spent years in India at Arunachala, as a disciple of Ramana Maharshi, and an associate of Camaldolese Benedictine monk Bede Griffiths who established a "Catholic Ashram" in the area.

Circa 1970, Michael Freedman moved to Auckland, New Zealand with is wife. Going on to study an undergraduate degree in Psychology at the University of Auckland during the later part of the 1970's.

Circa 1979/1980 He opened the "Sanctuary of the Angels" in a house on Horoeka Avenue, on the slopes of Mount Eden and built a flourishing order, performing monthly Solar Ingress rituals, a weekly Mystical Eucharistic Service (Mass of the Archangels), and running esoteric study groups and meditation evenings and well as weekend retreats a couple of times per year.

The Society's extensive training materials included courses on Mysticism, Tarot, Kabbalah, and High Magic. The whole system was vast and rich, and highly consistent. It drew extensively on traditional Jewish Kabbalistic and medieval Christian sources, bolstered with a profound knowledge of ancient religions and philosophy, and all imbued with a vitality very relevant to modern life.

Freedman also wrote many articles, and translated Latin, Greek and Hebrew texts into English, including a version of the Kabbalistic text the Sefer Yetzirah, and one of Giordano Bruno's Latin esoteric manuscripts. His written output was prolific, energetic and highly erudite, and mostly rooted in ancient and scholarly sources rather than the ideas of other modern occultists. In 1978, the Society also began offering a free meditation course by correspondence. Freedman presided over a collective which published New Zealand's leading esoteric periodical called Magic Pentacle for many years, L.S a senior member of the Society of Guardians, was its original editor). After Michael Freedman's death in 1996, the name was changed to New Pentacle Magazine.

Successive Senior Guardians and Sanctuaries 
After Michael Freedman's death in 1996, the office of Senior Guardian was inherited by the Prior of the Order, Dermot C. The Shekinah Gaia Sanctuary was opened in October 1999 on Waiheke Island, Auckland by the Abbess of the Society. The Senior Guardian Dermot C. officiated at this ceremony, and the current Senior Guardian Ciaran Masterson attended with about 20 other people. When the Abbess moved to Great Barrier Island the Sanctuary closed and the name of the sanctuary was changed to Sanctuary of the Rose. Dermot occasionally attended ceremonies as Senior Guardian on the Island, and several new members were received/dedicated during this time.

The Whangarei Sanctuary was dedicated at Midwinter 2001 with General Rituals starting Spring/Libra 2001 and continuing for some years, but currently seems to be mostly inactive.

Sanctuary of St Michael and All Angels (Auckland): Has been operating since 2014 under charter (but two members had been working with the Guardians material for over 20 years). It became the principal sanctuary of the Society in 2016 when Ciaran Masterson, the leader of the group was made the Senior Guardian of the Society.

References

External links
 Bet Yerusha Sanctuary

Magical organizations
Hermetic Qabalah